People of the Book is a 2008 historical novel by Geraldine Brooks.  The story focuses on imagined events surrounding the protagonist and real historical past of the still extant Sarajevo Haggadah, one of the oldest surviving Jewish illuminated texts.

Plot summary
The novel tells the fictional story of Dr. Hanna Heath, an Australian book conservator who comes to Sarajevo to restore the Haggadah. Her work on the book leaves her with questions: why is the book illustrated, unlike other Haggadot? Why was the last restoration job, a hundred years earlier, done so poorly? What happened to the metal clasps that once held the parchment pages pressed together? How did the Haggadah come from fifteenth-century Spain to the Balkans? In the course of the restoration she takes microscopic samples: fragments of a butterfly's wing caught in the spine, a long white cat hair tangled in the binding, traces of salt crystals, a wine stain mixed with blood.

The story alternates between showing Hanna researching the Haggadah in the present, searching archives and taking her samples to forensic labs, and following the history of the Haggadah across five hundred years, in reverse chronological order, revealing the (fictional) explanations for all of Hanna's discoveries.

Factual background
The book's Afterword briefly explains which parts of the novel are based on fact and which are imaginary.  Geraldine Brooks wrote an article for The New Yorker that provides more details about the Sarajevo Haggadah and its real-life rescuers, especially Dervis Korkut, who hid it from the Nazis.  It also explains that Lola, the young Jewish guerrilla fighter in the novel, is based on a real person named Mira Papo, who was sheltered by Dervis Korkut and his wife Servet.

Critical reception
The novel has been compared with Dan Brown's The Da Vinci Code, with USA Today calling it an erudite version of Brown's work, while other reviewers have noted that it is slower paced, that there are no cliffhangers, and that readers "are never convinced . . . (by its) contrived and clichéd personal story."

Awards
2008: The Australian Book Industry Award (ABIA) Book of the Year and Literary Fiction Book of the Year

References

External links
"I Have This Paper which I Know Comes from Israel", an interview with Davor Bakovic about his mother, Mira, a guerrilla fighter against the Nazis, on whom the character of Lola is based
"2nd Annual Interfaith Heroes Month No. 23: Dervis Korkut" - information and photos on Dervis and Servet Korkut, on whom the characters of Serif and Stela Kamal are based

2008 American novels
2008 Australian novels
American thriller novels
American mystery novels
American historical novels
Australian thriller novels
Australian mystery novels
Australian historical novels
Books about Jews and Judaism